WINGS: Women IN Great Sciences is and open network for all people at Lund University. The members of the network are scientists at all levels working in or outside the university, including PhD students and postdocs, and other staff at Lund University.

Background 

The network was initiated by co-workers at the Department of Geology, Lund University, in 2003, and in the beginning, it was an informal lunch club that met regularly to discuss science, careers, and equality issues. During 2007, the network expanded to include the Faculty of Science and related industries. In 2012, the network was further expanded to include the Faculty of Medicine and the Faculty of Engineering (LTH). In 2013, WINGS merged with StepUp, a PhD student and postdoc network focusing on career planning. In 2015, WINGS merged with the female grass root network WISE at CIRCLE, which is part of USV.

Steering Group 

The WINGS steering group is responsible for organizing activities such as seminars, meetings, workshops, and conferences, as well as distributing information to the members of the network through this webpage, our emailing list, and social media. The current steering committee consists of eight members from all three faculties, and the current coordinator is Johanna Stadmark, who is a researcher at Quaternary Sciences, Faculty of Science, following a common agreement of the other members of the steering group. WINGS is a member of the European Platform of Women Scientists, EPWS.

Activities 

WINGS organizes regular workshops and courses, as well as lunch-meetings with invited speakers to inspire discussion and development of research, career opportunities, innovation and the ongoing process of change for equality. Since 2008 WINGS organize a yearly conference to discuss research and equality issues. WINGS organize a yearly networking congress for PhD students and postdocs called StepUp.

References

External links 
 WINGS webpage at Lund University

Organizations for women in science and technology